The Basilica of St. John the Baptist also called Basilica of St. John the Baptist Patron of Breslavia is the Catholic cathedral seat of the Military Ordinariate of Germany. The church is located in the district of Neukölln in Berlin.

The first stone of the basilica was placed in 1894. The architect of the project was August Menken, who had thought of the church as a basilica in the Romanesque style of the Rhine. The solemn inauguration of the church took place on May 8, 1897, in the presence of Emperor William II and Empress Augusta Victoria.

On December 3, 1906, Pope Pius X awarded the church the title of the Minor Basilica. From February 1, 2005, the church became the headquarters of the military regular of the Federal Government.

See also
Roman Catholicism in Germany
St. John the Baptist

References

Basilica churches in Germany
Roman Catholic churches in Berlin
Roman Catholic cathedrals in Germany
Roman Catholic churches completed in 1897
Cathedrals of military ordinariates
19th-century Roman Catholic church buildings in Germany
Berlin John